Enekbatus is a genus of shrubs in the family Myrtaceae described as a genus in 2010. Enekbatus are endemic to Western Australia.

There are 11 species of Enekbatus that are recognised all of which are small to medium-sized shrubs that were once part of the genus Baeckea.

Species
The genus includes the following species:
 Enekbatus bounites
 Enekbatus clavifolius
 Enekbatus cristatus
 Enekbatus cryptandroides
 Enekbatus dualis
 Enekbatus eremaeus
 Enekbatus longistylus
 Enekbatus planifolius
 Enekbatus sessilis
 Enekbatus stowardii

References

 
Endemic flora of Western Australia
Myrtaceae genera
Myrtales of Australia
Rosids of Western Australia
Taxa named by Barbara Lynette Rye
Taxa named by Malcolm Eric Trudgen